Lyndsey "Lyn-Z" Adams Hawkins (born September 21, 1989) is an American professional skateboarder.

History and family 
Born in San Diego, Lyn-Z Adams Hawkins was raised in Cardiff-by-the-Sea, California, and spent part of her childhood in Sayulita, Mexico, just outside Puerto Vallarta. An athletic child, Hawkins started surfing and skateboarding at age 6. She got into skateboarding when her brother Tyler bought her a membership at the Encinitas YMCA. She also played soccer, baseball, basketball, and gymnastics.

Her legal name is Lyndsey, and Adams is her middle name. She started using the nickname Lyn-Z in the 4th grade.

Hawkins often customizes the griptape on her skateboards. Many bear the letters RIP, in memory of her father, who died in December 2003.

On June 4, 2011, Hawkins became engaged to Travis Pastrana, who stopped the show at the Nitro Circus Live World Tour in Las Vegas, got on one knee, and proposed. The two married on October 29, 2011, near Hawkins' southern California home.

On February 26, 2013, Hawkins and Pastrana announced on their social network webpages that they were expecting their first child due in September 2013. Hawkins gave birth to a girl named Addy Ruth on Labor Day, September 2, 2013. On August 5, 2014, she announced that she and Pastrana were expecting their second child; a girl named Bristol Murphy was born on February 9, 2015.

Skateboarding 

Hawkins is at the forefront of a very small group of professional female skaters.  She is also one of a few skaters to skate the DC Mega Ramp, and the first female skater to do so.

Due to a broken arm in 2005, and a torn ACL (resulting in surgery) in 2006, Lyn-Z has missed out on many competitions.  In lieu of participating, she was the on-camera host for the girls competition at the West 49 Canadian Open in Hamilton, Ontario in September 2006.

In 2007, Hawkins returned to competition, and won the gold medal in the Women's Vert competition at X Games 13 in Los Angeles.  In 2008, she placed second in the same competition, and in 2009 she returned to win another gold medal in 1st place, also in the Women's Vert competition.

Major sponsors include Volcom, Nixon Watches, Birdhouse Skateboards, Oakley eyewear, Type-S wheels, S-one helmets, and K-five Boardshop.

In 2008, Hawkins appeared on the cover of Concrete Wave Magazine's annual Skateboard Directory.

On November 21, 2009, Hawkins became the first female to land a 540 McTwist during the "Quiksilver Tony Hawk Show" in Paris, France.

Snowboarding 

While focused mainly on skateboarding, Hawkins is also an avid snowboarder.  She has recently begun entering snowboarding competitions.  In 2007, her year-end National ranking was 23rd in Slopestyle and 9th in Halfpipe.

Video games 
Hawkins made her video game debut in Tony Hawk's Project 8, becoming the second female playable skater in the Tony Hawk games after Elissa Steamer.  She later appeared in Tony Hawk: Ride, Tony Hawk: Shred, and Tony Hawk's Pro Skater HD.

Sponsors 
Etnies
Nixon Watches
Birdhouse Skateboards
Type S Wheels
k-5 Boardshop
Kicker
Volcom
Ethika

Skateboard videos 
Hawkins is featured on a number of skate DVDs including Getting Nowhere Faster and the Groms series of DVDs , which highlight some of the top Grommets in various Extreme Sports.

Major contest results

References

External links 
Official website
EXPN Profile

A video of Lyn-Z skateboarding
Lyn-z Adams Hawkins skating the mega-ramp
http://www.woa.tv/articles/at_lyn-z_adams_hawkins.html
Lyn-Z S.P.O.T profile
TheSideProject.com Interview

American skateboarders
Female skateboarders
Living people
1989 births
American female snowboarders
X Games athletes
People from Encinitas, California
Sportspeople from San Diego
21st-century American women
Racing drivers' wives and girlfriends